Winnipeg South was a provincial electoral division in Manitoba, Canada, which existed on two separate occasions.

It was initially created for the 1883 provincial election, and abolished with the 1920 election when Winnipeg became a single ten-member constituency.  It was re-established for the elections of 1949 and 1953 as a four-member constituency, and was divided into several single-member constituencies in 1958.

Winnipeg South (original constituency)
The original Winnipeg South constituency was created for the 1883 election, when the Winnipeg constituency was divided into two sections: Winnipeg North and Winnipeg South.  It was created a single-member constituency, and remained this way until the 1914 election when it returned two members.  From 1914 to 1920, electors were allowed to cast ballots for two seats, which were called "Winnipeg South A" and "Winnipeg South B".

Winnipeg South covered the most affluent and middle-class areas of Winnipeg, and usually supported the winning party in provincial elections. Premier Hugh John Macdonald represented the constituency from 1899 to 1900.

Members of the Legislative Assembly for Winnipeg South

Members of the Legislative Assembly for Winnipeg South "A"

Members of the Legislative Assembly for Winnipeg South "B"

Winnipeg South (re-established)
The single constituency of Winnipeg was divided into three sections for the 1949 election: Winnipeg North, Winnipeg Centre and Winnipeg South.  All three constituencies elected four members to the legislature, with electors choosing members by a single transferable ballot.

By this time, Winnipeg South had become well-established as the most conservative and middle-class section of Winnipeg.  It was dominated by the Civic Election Committee at the municipal level, and regularly returned pro-business candidates at the provincial level.  The division returned a total of five representatives, all of whom were prominent figures.  Liberal-Progressives John Stewart McDiarmid and Ronald Turner served as cabinet ministers in the administration of Douglas Campbell.  Dufferin Roblin became leader of the Progressive Conservative Party in 1954 and Premier of Manitoba in 1958, and included Gurney Evans in his cabinet.  Lloyd Stinson was Winnipeg South's sole representative from the left, winning election for the socialist Cooperative Commonwealth Federation in both 1949 and 1953.  He was named as the Manitoba CCF's leader in 1953.

The constituency was eliminated at the 1958 election, when Manitoba abolished its multi-member seats.  Several single-member constituencies were created in its place.

Members of the Legislative Assembly for Winnipeg South (1949-1958)

Election results

1883 general election

1885 by-election

1886 general election

1888 general election

1892 by-election

1892 general election

1896 general election

1899 general election

1900 by-election

1901 by-election

1903 general election

1907 general election

1910 general election

1914 general election

Winnipeg South A

Winnipeg South B

1915 general election

Winnipeg South A

Winnipeg South B

1949 general election

1953 general election

References 

Former provincial electoral districts of Manitoba